The following is a list of the Top 10 Films chosen annually by the National Board of Review of Motion Pictures, beginning in 1929.

History
From 1930 until 2018, the NBR chose 74 films that would go on to win the Academy Award for Best Picture as Best Film. Twenty four of these times, the film selected was number one on the NBR's list for that year.

1920s
1929:
Applause
Broadway
Bulldog Drummond
The Case of Lena Smith
Disraeli
Hallelujah!
The Letter
The Love Parade
Paris Bound
The Valiant

1930s
1930:
All Quiet on the Western Front 
Holiday
Laughter
The Man from Blankley's
Men Without Women
Morocco
Outward Bound
Romance
Street of Chance
Tol'able David

1931:
Cimarron 
City Lights
City Streets
Dishonored
The Front Page 
The Guardsman
Quick Millions
Rango
Surrender
Tabu

1932:
I Am a Fugitive from a Chain Gang 
As You Desire Me
A Bill of Divorcement
A Farewell to Arms 
Madame Racketeer
Payment Deferred
Scarface
Tarzan the Ape Man
Trouble in Paradise
Two Seconds

1933:
Topaze
Berkeley Square
Cavalcade 
Little Women 
Mama Loves Papa
The Pied Piper
She Done Him Wrong 
State Fair 
Three-Cornered Moon
Zoo in Budapest

1934:
It Happened One Night 
The Count of Monte Cristo
Crime Without Passion
Eskimo
The First World War
The Lost Patrol
Lot in Sodom
No Greater Glory
The Thin Man 
Viva Villa!

1935:
The Informer 
Alice Adams 
Anna Karenina
David Copperfield 
The Gilded Lily
Les Misérables 
The Lives of a Bengal Lancer 
Mutiny on the Bounty 
Ruggles of Red Gap 
Who Killed Cock Robin?

1936:
Mr. Deeds Goes to Town 
The Story of Louis Pasteur 
Modern Times
Fury
Winterset
The Devil Is a Sissy
Ceiling Zero
Romeo and Juliet 
The Prisoner of Shark Island
Green Pastures

1937:
Night Must Fall 
The Life of Emile Zola 
Black Legion
Camille
Make Way for Tomorrow
The Good Earth 
They Won't Forget
Captains Courageous 
A Star Is Born 
Stage Door

1938:
The Citadel 
Snow White and the Seven Dwarfs
The Beachcomber
To the Victor
Sing You Sinners
The Edge of the World
Of Human Hearts
Jezebel 
South Riding
Three Comrades

1939:
Confessions of a Nazi Spy
Wuthering Heights 
Stagecoach 
Ninotchka 
Young Mr. Lincoln
Crisis
Goodbye, Mr. Chips 
Mr. Smith Goes to Washington 
The Roaring Twenties
U-Boat 29

1940s
1940:
The Grapes of Wrath 
The Great Dictator 
Of Mice and Men 
Our Town 
Fantasia
The Long Voyage Home 
Foreign Correspondent 
The Biscuit Eater
Gone with the Wind 
Rebecca

1941:
Citizen Kane 
How Green Was My Valley 
The Little Foxes 
The Stars Look Down
Dumbo
High Sierra
Here Comes Mr. Jordan 
Tom, Dick and Harry
Road to Zanzibar
The Lady Eve

1942:
In Which We Serve 
One of Our Aircraft Is Missing
Mrs. Miniver 
Journey for Margaret
Wake Island 
The Male Animal
The Major and the Minor
Sullivan's Travels
The Moon and Sixpence
The Pied Piper

1943:
The Ox-Bow Incident 
Watch on the Rhine 
Air Force
Holy Matrimony
The Hard Way
Casablanca 
Lassie Come Home
Bataan
The Moon Is Down
The Next of Kin

1944:
None But the Lonely Heart 
Going My Way 
The Miracle of Morgan's Creek
Hail the Conquering Hero
The Song of Bernadette 
Wilson 
Meet Me in St. Louis
Thirty Seconds Over Tokyo
Thunder Rock
Lifeboat

1945:
The True Glory
The Lost Weekend 
The Southerner
The Story of G.I. Joe
The Last Chance
The Life and Death of Colonel Blimp
A Tree Grows In Brooklyn
The Fighting Lady
The Way Ahead
The Clock

1946:
Henry V 
Rome, Open City
The Best Years of Our Lives 
Brief Encounter
A Walk in the Sun
It Happened at the Inn
My Darling Clementine
The Diary of a Chambermaid
The Killers
Anna and the King of Siam

1947:
Monsieur Verdoux
Great Expectations 
Shoeshine
Crossfire 
Boomerang!
Odd Man Out
Gentleman's Agreement 
To Live in Peace
It's a Wonderful Life 
The Overlanders

1948:
Paisan
Day of Wrath
The Search
The Treasure of the Sierra Madre 
Louisiana Story
Hamlet 
The Snake Pit 
Johnny Belinda 
Joan of Arc
The Red Shoes

1949:
The Bicycle Thief
The Quiet One
Intruder in the Dust
The Heiress 
Devil in the Flesh
Quartet
Germany, Year Zero
Home of the Brave
A Letter to Three Wives 
The Fallen Idol

1950s
1950:
Sunset Boulevard 
All About Eve 
The Asphalt Jungle
The Men
Edge of Doom
Twelve O'Clock High 
Panic in the Streets
Cyrano de Bergerac
No Way Out
Stage Fright

1951:
A Place in the Sun 
The Red Badge of Courage
An American in Paris 
Death of a Salesman
Detective Story
A Streetcar Named Desire 
Decision Before Dawn 
Strangers on a Train
Quo Vadis 
Fourteen Hours

1952:
The Quiet Man 
High Noon 
Limelight
5 Fingers
The Snows of Kilimanjaro
The Thief
The Bad and the Beautiful
Singin' in the Rain
Above and Beyond
My Son John

1953:
Julius Caesar 
Shane 
From Here to Eternity 
Martin Luther
Lili
Roman Holiday 
Stalag 17
Little Fugitive
Mogambo
The Robe

1954:
On the Waterfront 
Seven Brides for Seven Brothers 
The Country Girl 
A Star Is Born
Executive Suite
The Vanishing Prairie
Sabrina
20,000 Leagues Under the Sea
The Unconquered
Beat the Devil

1955:
Marty 
East of Eden
Mister Roberts 
Bad Day at Black Rock
Summertime
The Rose Tattoo 
A Man Called Peter
Not as a Stranger
Picnic 
The African Lion

1956:
Around the World in 80 Days 
Moby Dick
The King and I 
Lust for Life
Friendly Persuasion 
Somebody Up There Likes Me
The Catered Affair
Anastasia
The Man Who Never Was
Bus Stop

1957:
The Bridge on the River Kwai 
12 Angry Men 
The Spirit of St. Louis
The Rising of the Moon
Albert Schweitzer
Funny Face
The Bachelor Party
The Enemy Below
A Hatful of Rain
A Farewell to Arms

1958:
The Old Man and the Sea
Separate Tables 
The Last Hurrah
The Long, Hot Summer
Windjammer
Cat on a Hot Tin Roof 
The Goddess
The Brothers Karamazov
Me and the Colonel
Gigi

1959:
The Nun's Story 
Ben-Hur 
Anatomy of a Murder 
The Diary of Anne Frank 
Middle of the Night
The Man Who Understood Women
Some Like It Hot
Suddenly, Last Summer
On the Beach
North by Northwest

1960s
1960:
Sons and Lovers 
The Alamo 
The Sundowners 
Inherit the Wind
Sunrise at Campobello
Elmer Gantry 
Home from the Hill
The Apartment 
Wild River
The Dark at the Top of the Stairs

1961:
Question 7
The Hustler 
West Side Story 
The Innocents
The Hoodlum Priest
Summer and Smoke
The Young Doctors
Judgment at Nuremberg 
One, Two, Three
Fanny

1962:
The Longest Day 
Billy Budd
The Miracle Worker
Lawrence of Arabia 
Long Day's Journey into Night
Whistle Down the Wind
Requiem for a Heavyweight
A Taste of Honey
Birdman of Alcatraz
War Hunt

1963:
Tom Jones 
Lilies of the Field 
All the Way Home
Hud
This Sporting Life
Lord of the Flies
The L-Shaped Room
The Great Escape
How the West Was Won 
The Cardinal

1964:
Becket 
My Fair Lady 
Girl with Green Eyes
The World of Henry Orient
Zorba the Greek 
Topkapi
The Chalk Garden
The Finest Hours
Four Days in November
Séance on a Wet Afternoon

1965:
The Eleanor Roosevelt Story
The Agony and the Ecstasy
Doctor Zhivago 
Ship of Fools 
The Spy Who Came in From the Cold
Darling 
The Greatest Story Ever Told
A Thousand Clowns 
The Train
The Sound of Music

1966:
A Man for All Seasons 
Born Free
Alfie 
Who's Afraid of Virginia Woolf? 
The Bible: In the Beginning...
Georgy Girl
John F. Kennedy: Years of Lightning, Day of Drums
It Happened Here
The Russians Are Coming, the Russians Are Coming 
Shakespeare Wallah

1967:
Far from the Madding Crowd
The Whisperers
Ulysses
In Cold Blood
The Family Way
The Taming of the Shrew
Doctor Dolittle 
The Graduate 
The Comedians
Accident

1968:
The Shoes of the Fisherman
Romeo and Juliet 
Yellow Submarine
Charly
Rachel, Rachel 
The Subject Was Roses
The Lion in Winter 
Planet of the Apes
Oliver! 
2001: A Space Odyssey

1969:
They Shoot Horses, Don't They?
Ring of Bright Water
Topaz
Goodbye, Mr. Chips
Battle of Britain
Isadora
The Prime of Miss Jean Brodie
Support Your Local Sheriff!
True Grit
Midnight Cowboy

1970s
1970:
Patton 
Kes
Women in Love
Five Easy Pieces 
Ryan's Daughter
I Never Sang for My Father
Diary of a Mad Housewife
Love Story 
The Virgin and the Gypsy
Tora! Tora! Tora!

1971:
Macbeth
The Boy Friend
One Day in the Life of Ivan Denisovich
The French Connection 
The Last Picture Show 
Nicholas and Alexandra 
The Go-Between
King Lear
The Tales of Beatrix Potter
Death in Venice

1972:
Cabaret 
Man of La Mancha
The Godfather 
Sounder 
1776
The Effect of Gamma Rays on Man-in-the-Moon Marigolds
Deliverance 
The Ruling Class
The Candidate
Frenzy

1973:
The Sting 
Paper Moon
Bang the Drum Slowly
Serpico
O Lucky Man!
The Last American Hero
The Hireling
The Day of the Dolphin
The Way We Were
The Homecoming

1974:
The Conversation 
Murder on the Orient Express
Chinatown 
The Last Detail
Harry and Tonto
A Woman Under the Influence
Thieves Like Us
Lenny 
Daisy Miller
The Three Musketeers

1975:
Nashville  / Barry Lyndon 
Conduct Unbecoming
One Flew Over the Cuckoo's Nest 
Lies My Father Told Me
Dog Day Afternoon 
The Day of the Locust
The Passenger
Hearts of the West
Farewell, My Lovely
Alice Doesn't Live Here Anymore

1976:
All the President's Men 
Network 
Rocky 
The Last Tycoon
The Seven-Per-Cent Solution
The Front
The Shootist
Family Plot
Silent Movie
Obsession

1977:
The Turning Point 
Annie Hall 
Julia 
Star Wars 
Close Encounters of the Third Kind
The Late Show
Saturday Night Fever
Equus
The Picture Show Man
Harlan County, USA

1978:
Days of Heaven
Coming Home 
Interiors
Superman
Movie Movie
Midnight Express 
An Unmarried Woman 
Pretty Baby
Girlfriends
Comes a Horseman

1979:
Manhattan
Yanks
The Europeans
The China Syndrome
Breaking Away 
Apocalypse Now 
Being There
Time After Time
North Dallas Forty
Kramer vs. Kramer

1980s
1980:
Ordinary People 
Raging Bull 
Coal Miner's Daughter 
Tess 
Melvin and Howard
The Great Santini
The Elephant Man 
The Stunt Man
My Bodyguard
Resurrection

1981:
Chariots of Fire  / Reds 
Atlantic City 
Stevie
Gallipoli
On Golden Pond 
Prince of the City
Raiders of the Lost Ark 
Heartland
Ticket to Heaven
Breaker Morant

1982:
Gandhi 
The Verdict 
Sophie's Choice
An Officer and a Gentleman
Missing 
E.T. the Extra-Terrestrial 
The World According to Garp
Tootsie 
Moonlighting
The Chosen

1983:
Betrayal / *Terms of Endearment 
Educating Rita
Tender Mercies 
The Dresser 
The Right Stuff 
Testament
Local Hero
The Big Chill 
Cross Creek
Yentl

1984:
A Passage to India 
Paris, Texas
The Killing Fields 
Places in the Heart 
Mass Appeal
Country
A Soldier's Story 
Birdy
Careful, He Might Hear You
Under the Volcano

1985:
The Color Purple 
Out of Africa 
The Trip to Bountiful
Witness 
Kiss of the Spider Woman 
Prizzi's Honor 
Back to the Future
The Shooting Party
Blood Simple
Dreamchild

1986:
A Room with a View 
Hannah and Her Sisters 
My Beautiful Laundrette
The Fly
Stand By Me
The Color of Money
Children of a Lesser God 
Round Midnight
Peggy Sue Got Married
The Mission

1987:
Empire of the Sun
The Last Emperor 
Broadcast News 
The Untouchables
Gaby: A True Story
Cry Freedom
Fatal Attraction 
Hope and Glory 
Wall Street
Full Metal Jacket

1988:
Mississippi Burning 
Dangerous Liaisons 
The Accused
The Unbearable Lightness of Being
The Last Temptation of Christ
Tucker: The Man and His Dream
Big
Running on Empty
Gorillas in the Mist
Midnight Run

1989:
Driving Miss Daisy 
Henry V
Sex, Lies, and Videotape
The Fabulous Baker Boys
My Left Foot 
Dead Poets Society 
Crimes and Misdemeanors
Born on the Fourth of July 
Glory
Field of Dreams

1990s
1990:
Dances with Wolves 
Hamlet
Goodfellas 
Awakenings 
Reversal of Fortune
Miller's Crossing
Metropolitan
Mr. and Mrs. Bridge
Avalon
The Grifters

1991:
The Silence of the Lambs 
Bugsy 
Grand Canyon
Thelma & Louise
Homicide
Dead Again
Boyz n the Hood
Rambling Rose
Frankie and Johnny
Jungle Fever

1992:
Howards End 
The Crying Game 
Glengarry Glen Ross
A Few Good Men 
The Player
Unforgiven 
One False Move
Peter's Friends
Bob Roberts
Malcolm X

1993:
Schindler's List 
The Age of Innocence
The Remains of the Day 
The Piano 
Shadowlands
In the Name of the Father 
Philadelphia
Much Ado About Nothing
Short Cuts
The Joy Luck Club

1994:
Forrest Gump  / Pulp Fiction 
Quiz Show 
Four Weddings and a Funeral 
Bullets over Broadway
Ed Wood
The Shawshank Redemption 
Nobody's Fool
The Madness of King George
Tom & Viv
Heavenly Creatures

1995:
Sense and Sensibility 
Apollo 13 
Carrington
Leaving Las Vegas
The American President
Mighty Aphrodite
Smoke
Persuasion
Braveheart 
The Usual Suspects

1996:
Shine 
The English Patient 
Fargo 
Secrets & Lies 
Everyone Says I Love You
Evita
Sling Blade
Trainspotting
Breaking the Waves
Jerry Maguire

1997:
L.A. Confidential 
As Good as It Gets 
The Wings of the Dove
Good Will Hunting 
Titanic 
The Sweet Hereafter
Boogie Nights
The Full Monty 
The Rainmaker
Jackie Brown

1998:
Gods and Monsters
Saving Private Ryan 
Elizabeth 
Happiness
Shakespeare in Love 
The Butcher Boy
Lolita
The Thin Red Line 
A Simple Plan
Dancing at Lughnasa

1999:
American Beauty 
The Talented Mr. Ripley
Magnolia
The Insider 
The Straight Story
Cradle Will Rock
Boys Don't Cry
Being John Malkovich
Tumbleweeds
Three Kings

2000s
2000:
Quills
Traffic 
Croupier
You Can Count on Me
Billy Elliot
Before Night Falls
Gladiator 
Wonder Boys
Sunshine
Dancer in the Dark

2001:
Moulin Rouge! 
In the Bedroom 
Ocean's Eleven
Memento
Monster's Ball
Black Hawk Down
The Man Who Wasn't There
A.I. Artificial Intelligence
The Pledge
Mulholland Drive

2002:
The Hours 
Adaptation 
Chicago 
Gangs of New York 
The Quiet American
Rabbit-Proof Fence
The Pianist 
Far from Heaven
Thirteen Conversations About One Thing
Frida

2003:
Mystic River 
The Last Samurai
The Station Agent
21 Grams
House of Sand and Fog
Lost in Translation 
Cold Mountain
In America
Seabiscuit 
Master and Commander: The Far Side of the World

2004:
Finding Neverland 
The Aviator 
Closer
Million Dollar Baby 
Sideways 
Kinsey
Vera Drake
Ray 
Collateral
Hotel Rwanda

2005:
Good Night, and Good Luck. 
Brokeback Mountain 
Capote 
Crash 
A History of Violence
Match Point
Memoirs of a Geisha
Munich 
Syriana
Walk the Line

2006:
Letters from Iwo Jima 
Babel 
Blood Diamond
The Departed 
The Devil Wears Prada
Flags of Our Fathers
The History Boys
Little Miss Sunshine 
Notes on a Scandal
The Painted Veil

2007:
No Country for Old Men 
The Assassination of Jesse James by the Coward Robert Ford
The Bourne Ultimatum
The Bucket List
Into the Wild
Juno 
The Kite Runner
Lars and the Real Girl
Michael Clayton 
Sweeney Todd: The Demon Barber of Fleet Street

2008:
Slumdog Millionaire 
Burn After Reading
Changeling
The Curious Case of Benjamin Button 
The Dark Knight
Defiance
Frost/Nixon 
Gran Torino
Milk 
WALL-E
The Wrestler

2009:
Up in the Air 
(500) Days of Summer
An Education 
The Hurt Locker 
Inglourious Basterds 
Invictus
The Messenger
A Serious Man 
Star Trek
Up 
Where the Wild Things Are

2010s
2010:
The Social Network 
Another Year
The Fighter 
Hereafter
Inception 
The King's Speech 
Shutter Island
The Town
Toy Story 3 
True Grit 
Winter's Bone

2011:
Hugo 
The Artist 
The Descendants 
Drive
The Girl with the Dragon Tattoo
Harry Potter and the Deathly Hallows – Part 2
The Ides of March
J. Edgar
The Tree of Life 
War Horse

2012:
Zero Dark Thirty 
Argo 
Beasts of the Southern Wild 
Django Unchained 
Les Misérables 
Lincoln 
Looper
The Perks of Being a Wallflower
Promised Land
Silver Linings Playbook

2013:
Her 
12 Years a Slave 
Fruitvale Station
Gravity 
Inside Llewyn Davis
Lone Survivor
Nebraska 
Prisoners
Saving Mr. Banks
The Secret Life of Walter Mitty
The Wolf of Wall Street

2014:
A Most Violent Year
American Sniper 
Birdman 
Boyhood 
Fury
Gone Girl
The Imitation Game 
Inherent Vice
The LEGO Movie
Nightcrawler
Unbroken

2015:
Mad Max: Fury Road
Bridge of Spies 
Creed
The Hateful Eight
Inside Out
The Martian 
Room 
Sicario
Spotlight 
Straight Outta Compton

2016:
Manchester by the Sea 
Arrival 
Hacksaw Ridge 
Hail, Caesar!
Hell or High Water 
Hidden Figures 
La La Land 
Moonlight 
Patriots Day
Silence
Sully

2017:
The Post 
Baby Driver
Call Me by Your Name 
The Disaster Artist
Downsizing
Dunkirk 
The Florida Project
Get Out 
Lady Bird 
Logan 
Phantom Thread

2018:
Green Book 
The Ballad of Buster Scruggs
Black Panther 
Can You Ever Forgive Me?
Eighth Grade
First Reformed
If Beale Street Could Talk
Mary Poppins Returns
A Quiet Place
Roma 
A Star Is Born

2019:
The Irishman 
1917 
Dolemite Is My Name
Ford v Ferrari 
Jojo Rabbit 
Knives Out
Marriage Story 
Once Upon a Time in Hollywood 
Richard Jewell
Uncut Gems
Waves

2020s
2020:
Da 5 Bloods
First Cow
The Forty-Year-Old Version
Judas and the Black Messiah
The Midnight Sky
Minari
News of the World
Nomadland
Promising Young Woman
Soul
Sound of Metal

2021:
Licorice Pizza
Belfast
Don't Look Up
Dune 
King Richard
The Last Duel
Nightmare Alley
Red Rocket
The Tragedy of Macbeth 
West Side Story

2022:
 Top Gun: Maverick
 Aftersun 
 Avatar: The Way of Water
 The Banshees of Inisherin
 Everything Everywhere All at Once
 The Fabelmans
 Glass Onion: A Knives Out Mystery
 RRR
 Till
 The Woman King
 Women Talking

References

National Board of Review Awards
Top film lists